Pedro Miguel Santos Amador (born 18 December 1998) is a Portuguese professional footballer who plays for Moreirense F.C. as a left-back.

Club career

Braga
Amador was born in Santa Iria de Azóia, Loures, Lisbon District. He played youth football for three clubs, including Sporting CP from ages 8 to 14.

Amador started his senior career in the lower leagues, with S.U. 1º Dezembro. On 31 January 2018 he joined S.C. Braga, signing a three-and-a-half-year contract and being assigned to their reserves in the LigaPro.

On 31 March 2018, Amador made his professional debut with Braga B, playing the entire 1–1 away draw against Varzim S.C. and being booked. He scored his first goal in the second division on 19 January 2019, in a 3–1 home victory over F.C. Paços de Ferreira.

Amador's maiden appearance in the Primeira Liga with the first team occurred on 23 February 2020, when he came on as a first-half substitute for the injured Nuno Sequeira in an eventual 3–1 home defeat of Vitória de Setúbal. He made his first start on 6 March 2020 in another fixture at the Estádio Municipal de Braga that ended in a 3–1 win, now against Portimonense SC.

Moreirense
On 14 August 2020, Amador signed a four-year contract with Moreirense F.C. of the same league. He missed the vast majority of the season, due to a cruciate ligament injury to his left knee.

References

External links

1998 births
Living people
People from Loures
Sportspeople from Lisbon District
Portuguese footballers
Association football defenders
Primeira Liga players
Liga Portugal 2 players
Campeonato de Portugal (league) players
S.U. 1º Dezembro players
S.C. Braga B players
S.C. Braga players
Moreirense F.C. players